Cyberrebate.com, Inc. was an online retailer founded in May 1998 that went bankrupt in May 2001, after the collapse of the dot-com bubble.

The company sold items at grossly inflated prices, as much as 10 times the list price, but promised customers a 100% rebate.

The company relied on the assumption that 50% of its customers would neglect to apply for their rebate.

History
Joel Granik, Joseph Lichter and Athan Vadiakas started the website on May 16, 1998. By November 2000, the company claimed to have rebated $39 million to its customers.

In January 2001, it was the third–ranked online retailer in the United States and had 7.7 million web users per month.

The company filed for bankruptcy protection under Chapter 11, Title 11, United States Code on 16 May 2001, citing $83.3 million in liabilities and $24.5 million in assets. Approximately $80 million was due directly to customers in unpaid rebates. At the time of the bankruptcy filing, there were 9 customers that were due pending rebates of $79,000-$100,000 each.

In April 2005, some creditors were awarded $0.08802 per dollar of allowed claims. A second, final disbursement was made to creditors in August 2006 for $0.0006276 per dollar of allowed claims, or roughly $1 for every $1,600 claimed.

References

American companies established in 1998
Retail companies established in 1998
Internet properties established in 1998
Retail companies disestablished in 2007
Defunct online companies of the United States
Defunct websites
Online retailers of the United States
Dot-com bubble